Gresham is an extinct town in Polk County, in the U.S. state of Missouri.

A post office called Gresham was established in 1885, and remained in operation until 1900. The community has the name of Walter Q. Gresham, 33rd United States Secretary of State.

References

Ghost towns in Missouri
Former populated places in Polk County, Missouri